Patrick Joseph Livingston (January 14, 1880 – September 19, 1977) was a Major League Baseball catcher who played for seven seasons. He played for the Cleveland Blues in 1901, the Cincinnati Reds in 1906, the Philadelphia Athletics from 1909 to 1911, the Cleveland Naps in 1912, and the St. Louis Cardinals in 1917. Livingston was the last surviving player of the inaugural year for the American League, .  At the time of his death, he was the oldest living former major league player.

References

External links

1880 births
1977 deaths
Major League Baseball catchers
Cleveland Blues (1901) players
Cincinnati Reds players
Philadelphia Athletics players
Cleveland Naps players
St. Louis Cardinals players
Baseball players from Cleveland
Wheeling Stogies players
Indianapolis Indians players
Sioux City Indians players
Milwaukee Brewers (minor league) managers
Milwaukee Brewers (minor league) players